Tamari Davis (born February 15, 2003) is an American sprinter.

A native of Gainesville, Florida, Davis attended Gainesville High School, and Oak Hall School. On January 30, 2020, at the age of 16, Tamari signed a professional contract with adidas. She has career-best times of 10.83 in the 100 meters and 22.48 in the 200 meters. In her sixth race as a professional, in February 2021, she lowered her career best at 60 metres down to 7.18 seconds, at the East Coast Invitational beating an international field including Veronica Campbell-Brown. Davis’ previous best was 7.19 from 2020 which was the world best U18 time.

On July 24, 2020 in Clermont, Florida, Davis ran 100m in 11.15 seconds which placed her 10th on the year list worldwide for 2020.

References

External links
 

2003 births
Living people
American female sprinters
Track and field athletes from Florida
Sportspeople from Gainesville, Florida
21st-century American women